Lütje Hörn is an uninhabited East Frisian Island in the North Sea. Lütje Hörn is an unincorporated area of Leer district in Lower Saxony.

History 
Lütje Hörn was first mentioned in 1576 as Hooghe Hörn in a sailing guide. Since 1859 the island has been shown in  topographical maps on the mudflats (Watt) southeast of Borkum.

Geography 
In contrast to all other East Frisian islands, Lütje Hörn is aligned in a north-south direction. This is due to the location of the island in the eastern channel of the Ems. Since the first documentary records the location of the island has moved about two kilometres further to the southeast. Between 1999 and 2005, the island continued to migrate eastwards by another .

Due to erosion Lütje Hörn has continuously lost surface area. In 1957 the high-water free area was still , including about one acre of large dunes. The storm surge of February 1962 caused a significant loss of land and dune erosion, and further losses were incurred by the winter storm surges of 1989/1990. In 1987, the area above the mean high-water mark was only , a few years later it had reduced to just .

Access
The island can only be visited with the approval of the National Park Administration, because it belongs to Zone I of the Wadden Sea National Parks and is a bird protection island. There are no buildings on the island.

References

External links 

East Frisian Islands
Uninhabited islands of Germany
Islands of Lower Saxony
Unincorporated areas of Germany